The 2021 Atlantic Coast Conference baseball tournament was held from May 25 through 30 at Truist Field in Charlotte, North Carolina. The annual tournament determined the conference champion of the Division I Atlantic Coast Conference for college baseball. Duke will receive the league's automatic bid to the 2021 NCAA Division I baseball tournament after defeating NC State in the Championship game.

The tournament has been held every year but two since 1973, with Clemson winning ten championships, the most all-time. Georgia Tech has won nine championships, and Florida State has won eight titles since their entry into the league in 1992. Charter league member Duke, along with recent entrants Virginia Tech, Boston College, Pittsburgh, Notre Dame and Louisville have never won the event.

Format and seeding
The winner of each seven-team division and the top ten other teams based on conference winning percentage, regardless of division, from the conference's regular season were seeded one through twelve.  Seeds one and two were awarded to the two division winners.  Teams were then divided into four pools of three teams each, with the winners advancing to single elimination bracket for the championship.

If a 1–1 tie were to occur among all three teams in a pool, the highest seeded team will advance to the semifinals. Because of this, seeds 5–12 must win both pool play games to advance to the single-elimination bracket, and seeds 1–4 must only win the game against the first game winner. For example, if the 7 seed beats the 11 seed in the first game, then the winner of the 7 seed versus 2 seed advances to the semi-finals and the result of the 11 vs. 2 game would not determine further play.

Pool play is the official model of how the ACC tournament is played, but it can also be modeled as a single-elimination tournament. The tie-breaker described above is equivalent to a first round bye for the top four seeds.  Seeds 5 through 12 play a first round game each, then the second round games between the first round winners and the top seeds determine who advances to the semi-finals.   Games between the top seeds and the first round losers are also played but those are  equivalent to consolation games that do not lead to further play.

The seeds were announced on May 22, after the conclusion of the regular season.

 Three-way tie broken by combined head-to-head records.
 Two-way tie broken by combined head-to-head records.

Schedule and Results

Schedule 

Source:

Pool Play

Pool A

Pool B

Pool C

Pool D

Playoffs

Championship Game

All–Tournament Team

Source:

References

Tournament
Atlantic Coast Conference baseball tournament
Atlantic Coast Conference baseball tournament
Atlantic Coast Conference baseball tournament
College baseball tournaments in North Carolina
Baseball competitions in Charlotte, North Carolina